Molly Nutley (born 16 March 1995) is a Swedish actress. She is the daughter of actress Helena Bergström and film director Colin Nutley. Nutley got her first minor role in a film in the film Så olika in 2009, which her mother directed.

Nutley however, got recognition in the film Änglagård – tredje gången gillt, as Alice (who is the daughter of the main character Fanny, played by Bergström).

Nutley was a contestant on Let's Dance 2012, where she placed second, behind footballer Anton Hysén.

In 2021 she starred in the Swedish film directed by her mother,  Dancing Queens.

References 

1995 births
Swedish actresses
Living people
Swedish people of English descent